Hyena is a 2020 South Korean television series starring Kim Hye-soo and Ju Ji-hoon. It aired on SBS TV from February 21 to April 11, 2020.

Synopsis
Hyena deals with lawyers at Song & Kim who only work for the richest 1% of society. Jung Geum-ja is a swashbuckling lawyer who crosses the boundaries of law and lawlessness, justice and injustice, ethics and corruption. Armed with the strongest survival instincts, she is a true hyena that chases after money and success no matter what it takes. Yoon Hee-jae is her polar opposite rival. He is a pedigreed and elite lawyer who is confident in his abilities. He possesses a brilliant mind that is wrapped around his ego, but he misses the grit of Geum-ja and gets outsmarted by her on many occasions.

Cast

Main
 Kim Hye-soo as Jung Geum-ja
 Ju Ji-hoon as Yoon Hee-jae

Supporting
 Lee Geung-young as Song Pil-jung
 Kim Ho-jung as Kim Min-joo
 Park Soo-young as Jo Woo-suk 
 Oh Yoon-hong as Baek Hee-joon
 Han Joon-woo as Kim Young-joon
 Moon Ye-won as Baek Woon-mi
 Jung Dong-geun as Choo Don-shik
 Hwang Bo-ra as Shim Yoo-mi
 Kim Ji-in as Tara
 Jeon Seok-ho as Ga Gi-hyuk

Episodes

Viewership

Awards and nominations

Original soundtrack

Track listings

References

External links
  
 
 
 

Seoul Broadcasting System television dramas
2020 South Korean television series debuts
2020 South Korean television series endings
South Korean legal television series
Television series by KeyEast
Korean-language Netflix exclusive international distribution programming